Good Friday processions in Baliuag  or Holy Week procession in Baliuag, Bulacan is an event taking place in Holy Week, in a traditional Roman Catholic culture of the St. Augustine Parish Church of Baliuag.

In the Philippines, Good Friday while others contend that it is a corruption of "God Friday". is a religious holiday observed primarily by Christians commemorating the crucifixion of Jesus Christ and his death at Calvary. The holiday is observed during Holy Week as part of the Paschal Triduum on the Friday preceding Easter Sunday, and may coincide with the Jewish observance of Passover. It is also known as Holy Friday, Great Friday, Black Friday, or Easter Friday, though the latter properly refers to the Friday in Easter week.

Baliuag Good Friday processions like any other religious processions are found in almost every form of Christian and Catholic worship, such as Holy Week processions. Some biblical examples were the processions with the Ark of Covenant and the procession of Jesus on a donkey into Jerusalem.

Carrozas
In Baliuag, Bulacan, the 2013 "Prusisyon ng mga Santo" was the Lenten rite wherein 96 carrozas participated compared to some 83 religious images that were paraded through the streets in the previous years. In the Lenten procession, religious fervor and piety compelled the town people of Baliuag to launch over a hundred richly adorned giant floats depicting the passion of Jesus Christ.

Held every Holy Wednesday and Good Friday, the procession starts at 6:00 in the Evening. The grand procession of more than 80 images became an anticipated attraction on Holy Wednesday and Good Friday.

The 2013 Good Friday 96 massive carriages carrying life size dioramas depicting a scene in the life of Jesus were paraded all over town after sunset. The solemn rite on Good Friday, called the Baliuag Lenten Procession was witnessed by local and foreign tourists, including the Apostolic Nunciature to the Philippines' Apostolic Nuncio on that time, Archbishop Giuseppe Pinto, who was accompanied by his aide Msgr. Gabor Pinter.

It is the longest Lenten procession in the Philippines, followed by the Holy Week Procession from the San Isidro Labrador Parish from the nearby town of Pulilan. The 96 Baliuag (St. Augustine Parish Church of Baliuag) floats showcased the grand parade of lavishly decorated carriages which event culminated in the blessing with holy water of the floats and the faithful by 2 Baliuag Priests from the Team Ministry of the Diocese of Malolos. Passion

In the 2017 Holy Week Procession, the carrozas has an approximate of 117 carrozas compared in 2016, when there was 114 carrozas only. In 2018, only 1 carroza was added, making the total number of carrozas to 118, by 2019, there are now 121 (including 3 additional carrozas: 121A, 121B and 121C). And this Year 2020, only 1 carroza was added, making it at 122 carrozas.

See also

 St. Augustine Parish Church of Baliuag
 Holy Week in the Philippines
 Processions
 Good Friday
 Crucifixion of Jesus
 Good Friday Prayer
 Improperia
 Life of Jesus in the New Testament

Related days
 Ascension
 Easter Monday
 Easter season
 Maundy Thursday
 Pentecost

Footnotes

References

External links

 Good Friday traditions, solemn rites held today Holy Wednesday Focuses On Judas’ Betrayal Of Jesus 
 Good Friday traditions, solemn rites held today Holy Wednesday Focuses On Judas’ Betrayal Of Jesus 
 Baliuag processions
 Tourists witness Good Friday procession in Baliwag
 The Eastern Orthodox commemoration of Holy Friday
 Great Friday  instructions from S. V. Bulgakov's Handbook for Church Servers (Russian Orthodox Church)
 "Good Friday" article from The Catholic Encyclopedia
 Episcopal Good Friday Service
 Presbyterian Good Friday Service

Holy Week processions
Holy Week in the Philippines
Religion in Bulacan
Tourist attractions in Bulacan